Cédric Pioline and Marc Rosset were the defending champions, but Pioline did not compete this year in order to focus on the singles tournament. Rosset teamed up with Andrei Medvedev and were forced to withdraw before their quarterfinal match.

Sergio Casal and Emilio Sánchez won the title by defeating Menno Oosting and Daniel Vacek 7–6, 6–4 in the final.

Seeds

Draw

Draw

References

External links
 Official results archive (ATP)
 Official results archive (ITF)

Swiss Open (tennis)
Doubles